A Chinese vowel diagram or Chinese vowel chart is a schematic arrangement of the vowels of the Chinese language, which usually refers to Standard Chinese. The earliest known Chinese vowel diagrams were made public in 1920 by Chinese linguist Yi Tso-lin with the publication of his Lectures on Chinese Phonetics, three years after Daniel Jones published the famous "cardinal vowel diagram" in 1917. Yi Tso-lin refers to those diagrams as "(simple/compound) rhyme composition charts [單/複韻構成圖]", which are diagrams depicting Chinese monophthongs and diphthongs.

Unlike the trapezoidal English vowel diagram (right), the Chinese vowel diagram (left) is triangular. The phonetic symbols used in this diagram are known as the "National Phonetic Alphabet [注音字母]" or "National Phonetic Symbols [注音符號]" or simply "Bopomofo". Six vowels or monophthongs (simple rhyme or 單韻) are depicted in this diagram. They are:

ㄧ (IPA ), as in ㄧˋ (易, easy)
ㄨ (IPA ), as in ㄨˋ (霧, fog)
ㄦ (IPA ), as in ㄦˋ (二, two)
ㄛ (IPA ), as in ㄆㄛˋ (破, broken)
ㄜ (IPA ), as in ㄜˋ (餓, hungry)
ㄚ (IPA ), as in ㄆㄚˋ (怕, fear)

Note that this chart utilizes four degrees of vowel height (closed, half-closed, half-open, open), three degrees of vowel backness (front, central, back), and three degrees of vowel roundedness (spread, natural, round). The placement of ㄦ() may be questionable, but all other vowels are generally speaking where they ought to be.

The same vowel chart is used to depict diphthongs (compound rhyme or 複韻), with an arrow indicating the starting position and ending position of each diphthong. Six falling diphthongs are depicted in the following diagram. They are：

ㄩ (IPA ), as in ㄩˋ (玉, jade)
ㄝ (IPA ), as in ㄧㄝˋ (夜, night)
ㄟ (IPA ), as in ㄌㄟˋ (累, tired)
ㄡ (IPA ), as in ㄉㄡˋ (豆, bean)
ㄞ (IPA ), as in ㄉㄞˋ (帶, belt)
ㄠ (IPA ), as in ㄉㄠˋ (道, way)

The reason why apparent monophthongs ㄩ  and ㄝ  are included in this chart is purely phonological and historical. According to this theory, those two vowels are really diphthongs, i.e. ㄧㄨ  and ㄧㄝ . Even so, those vowels should be considered "rising diphthongs" on a par with those in the next diagram.

The next diagram depicts four rising diphthongs, as follows:

ㄧㄛ (IPA ), as in ㄧㄛˋ (唷, an interjection)
ㄨㄛ (IPA ), as in ㄨㄛˋ (臥, lie)
ㄧㄚ (IPA ), as in ㄧㄚˋ (亞, Asia)
ㄨㄚ (IPA ), as in ㄨㄚˋ (襪, socks)

Symbols of Mandarin vowels
The exact number of vowels in Mandarin may vary depending on the phonological theory and methodology. The major systems for Mandarin (Putonghua) transliteration are listed below

Notice that those two IPA symbols are now considered Obsolete and nonstandard symbols in the International Phonetic Alphabet.

References
Yi Tso-lin (1920). Lectures on Chinese Phonetics [國音學講義]. Commercial Press. Shanghai.

Phonology
Phonetics